The Moldavian dialect (subdialectul / graiul moldovean / moldovenesc) is one of several dialects of the Romanian language (Daco-Romanian). It is spoken across the approximate area of the historical region of Moldavia, now split between the Republic of Moldova, Romania, and Ukraine.

The delimitation of the Moldavian dialect, as with all other Romanian dialects, is made primarily by analyzing its phonetic features and only marginally by morphological, syntactical, and lexical characteristics.

The Moldavian dialect is the representative of the northern grouping of Romanian dialects and has influenced the Romanian spoken over large areas of Transylvania.

The Moldavian and the Wallachian dialects are the only two that have been consistently identified and recognized by linguists. They are clearly distinct in dialect classifications made by Heimann Tiktin, Mozes Gaster, Gustav Weigand, Sextil Pușcariu, Sever Pop, Emil Petrovici, Romulus Todoran, Ion Coteanu, Alexandru Philippide, Iorgu Iordan, Emanuel Vasiliu, and others, whereas the other dialects have been considerably more controversial and difficult to classify.

The Moldavian dialect is not synonymous with Moldovan language. The latter is another term for the Romanian language as used in the Republic of Moldova. The border between Romania and the Republic of Moldova does not correspond to any significant isoglosses to justify a dialectal division; phonetics and morphology (which normally define dialectal classifications) are nearly identical across the border, whereas lexical differences are minimal.

Geographic distribution

The Moldavian dialect is spoken in the northeastern part of Romania, the Republic of Moldova, and small areas of Ukraine. It is the only Romance variety spoken east of the Eastern Carpathians. In detail, its distribution area covers the following administrative or historical regions:

in Western Moldavia: the counties of Bacău, Botoșani, Galați, Iași, Neamț, Suceava, Vaslui, Vrancea;
in Muntenia and Northern Dobruja, some isoglosses extend over the northern parts of the following counties: Buzău, Brăila, Tulcea;
in the Republic of Moldova: the whole territory, including the breakaway region of Transnistria;
in Ukraine:
Chernivtsi Oblast: Northern Bukovina, the Hertsa region, and Northern Bessarabia;
Odesa Oblast: the historical region of Budjak (consisting of the current raions of Bilhorod-Dnistrovskyi, Bolhrad, Izmail) and other hromadas in the Odesa Oblast;
smaller pockets in other parts of Ukraine;
in the north-eastern half of Transylvania, various isoglosses include all or part of the following counties: Bistrița-Năsăud, Harghita, Covasna, Cluj (eastern half), Mureș (northern half).

Transitional areas

Transitional varieties of the Moldavian dialect are found in areas of contact with the other dialects. As such, Moldavian features often occur outside the historical Moldavia: in northern Dobruja, in northeastern Muntenia, and in north-east Transylvania.

Sound inventory

Plus diphthongs.

Particularities

Phonetic features

The Moldavian dialect has the following phonetic particularities that contrast it with the other Romanian dialects:

Consonants
The postalveolar affricates  become the fricatives :  for standard ceapă, cină, gene (they are not also palatalized like in the Banat dialect). As a consequence, the affricate  and the fricative  merge into the latter:  for joc, sânge. However, the Atlasul lingvistic român (1938–1942) and other field works record examples of pronunciations showing that, while the merger covers most of the dialect area, it is not systematic and sometimes found in free variation. In parts of the south-western and north-eastern Moldavia the distinction is preserved.
After the fricatives  and the affricate  (sometimes also after ), a vowel shift occurs that changes  into ,  into , and  into :  for semn, singur, seară, zer, zid, zeamă, șale, rășină, jale, țes, țeapăn, reci. In the same phonetic contexts, the phoneme , which is generally responsible for indicating the plural in nouns and adjectives or the second person in verbs, is no longer realized:  (for standard părinți, vezi). As a consequence, the number distinction is completely lost in some nouns and adjectives, such as moș, leneș, colț, ursuz.
The labials  receive a palatalized pronunciation when followed by front vowels and become , respectively:  for copil, bine, miel.
Similarly, the palatalization of the labio-dentals  occurs, but in two different ways. In the southern half of the dialect area they become , respectively, whereas in the northern half they become :  for fierbe, vițel.
The dentals  are left unchanged before : .
In the northern part,  followed by  changes into : holbură, hulpe, hultan (compare with standard volbură, vulpe, vultan).

Vowels
 After the labial ,  changes into  and  into :  for lovesc, să lovească.
Word-final  becomes :  for mamă, casă.
Unstressed  closes to :  for acoperit (rare).
The diphthong  is preserved:  for soare, boală.
Unstressed  in middle and final positions closes to :  for lapte, desfac.
In the northern areas, the vowel  immediately before the stress opens to :  for măgar, bătrân, tăcut, pădure.
The diphthong  becomes :  for băiat, încuiat.
Etymologic  is preserved in the words  for câine, mâine, mâini, pâine.
The diphthong  in final positions becomes the monophthong :  for avea, spunea.

Morphological features

Feminine nouns ending in -că have genitive and dative forms ending in -căi: maicăi, puicăi (compare with standard maicii, puicii).
The noun tată "father" with the definite article has the form tatul (standard tatăl).
The possessive article is invariable: a meu, a mea, a mei, a mele ("mine", standard al meu, a mea, ai mei, ale mele).
The number distinction is made in verbs in the imperfect at the 3rd person: era / erau, făcea / făceau (like in the standard language).
The simple perfect is not used, except rarely, only in the 3rd person, with the simple value of a past tense.
The auxiliary for the compound perfect has the same form for both the singular and the plural of the 3rd person: el o fost / ei o fost ("he was / they were", standard el a fost, ei au fost).
In northern Moldavia, the pluperfect is also made analytically: m-am fost dus, am fost venit ("I had gone, I had come", standard mă dusesem, venisem).
The future tense in verbs uses the infinitive and is sometimes identical to it: va veni, a veni ("he will come", standard only va veni).
The following subjunctive forms occur: să deie, să steie, să beie, să ieie, să vreie (standard să dea, să stea, să bea, să ia, să vrea).
The following imperatives occur: ádă, vină (standard adú, vino).
When the object of a verb is another verb, the latter is in its infinitive form, including the isolated morpheme a: prinde a fierbe ("starts to boil", the standard uses the subjunctive: prinde să fiarbă or începe să fiarbă).
Genitives and datives of nouns tend to be formed analytically: dă mâncare la pisică ("give food to the cat", standard dă mâncare pisicii).

Lexical particularities

Some words have preserved archaic forms: îmblu, împlu, întru, înflu, nour, dirept (compare with standard umblu, umplu, intru, umflu, nor, drept).
A particular variant for the personal pronoun for the 3rd person occurs frequently and is used for animates and inanimates alike: dânsul, dânsa, dânșii, dânsele ("he, she, they" as well as "it, they", compare with el, ea, ei, ele). In the standard language, these forms have started being used as 3rd person polite pronouns.
The demonstrative pronouns have particular forms:  ("this" masculine and feminine, "that" masculine and feminine; compare with standard acesta, aceasta, acela, aceea).
Other specific words: omăt ("snow", zăpadă), agudă ("mulberry", dudă), poame ("grapes", struguri), perje ("plums", prune), ciubotă ("high boot", cizmă), cori ("measles", pojar), etc.

Sample

Moldavian dialect: 

Standard Romanian: Ea avea două vaci și se mirau oamenii de vacile ei că dădeau un ciubăraș de lapte. Și așa de la o vreme stârpiseră vacile, nu mai dădeau lapte.

English translation: "She had two cows and people were amazed at her cows for giving a bucketful of milk. And so from a while the cows became dry, they stopped giving milk."

Notes

Bibliography

Vasile Ursan, "Despre configurația dialectală a dacoromânei actuale", Transilvania (new series), 2008, No. 1, pp. 77–85 
Spînu, Stela, "Graiurile româneşti din nord-estul Republicii Moldova", Chişinău, 2011
Ilona Bădescu, "Dialectologie", teaching material for the University of Craiova.
Elena Buja, Liliana Coposescu, Gabriela Cusen, Luiza Meseșan Schmitz, Dan Chiribucă, Adriana Neagu, Iulian Pah, Raport de țară: România, country report for the Lifelong Learning Programme MERIDIUM

Further reading
Marian Antofi, "Evoluția consoanelor africate în subdialectul moldovenesc", Ovidius University Annals of Philology, vol. XIV, nr. 15-21, 2003, pp. 15–21

See also
Romanian phonology

Romanian language varieties and styles
Moldavia